Menemerus silver is a jumping spider species in the genus Menemerus that lives in Tunisia and resembles Menemerus animatus, Menemerus davidi and Menemerus guttatus. It was first described by Wanda Wesołowska in 1999.

References

Spiders described in 1999
Fauna of Tunisia
Salticidae
Spiders of Africa
Taxa named by Wanda Wesołowska